The 2008–09 ECHL season was the 21st of the ECHL.

League business

Team changes
The league welcomed one new franchise, the Ontario Reign, which relocated from Beaumont, Texas and played at the Citizens Business Bank Arena in Ontario, California.

Two teams, the Columbia Inferno and the Myrtle Beach Thunderboltz, voluntarily suspended operations for the season with plans on returning in the 2009–10 season. The Myrtle Beach franchise was originally planning to return to operations, but their arena had not been completed in time for the Board of Governors Meeting during the All-Star Break. The league announced that they were immediately terminating the Pensacola Ice Pilots franchise, because the team's owners did not intend on fielding a team for the 2008–09 season or any season after that. The team was a founding member of the ECHL as the Nashville Knights and moved to Pensacola, Florida, after the 1995–96 season.

Realignment
On June 23, the ECHL announced the new divisional alignment of its 23 franchises.  The league saw three teams vacate the South Division of the American Conference shrinking the division from nine to six teams and added a franchise to the Pacific Division of the National Conference increasing the division total from four teams to five.  There will be thirteen teams in the American Conference, which stretches from New York south to Florida and from Mississippi east to New Jersey, and ten teams in the National Conference which stretches from Alaska south to Arizona.

American Conference 

North Division
Cincinnati Cyclones
Dayton Bombers
Elmira Jackals
Johnstown Chiefs
Reading Royals
Trenton Devils
Wheeling Nailers

South Division
Augusta Lynx
Charlotte Checkers
Florida Everblades
Gwinnett Gladiators
Mississippi Sea Wolves
South Carolina Stingrays

National Conference 

Pacific Division
Bakersfield Condors
Fresno Falcons
Las Vegas Wranglers
Ontario Reign
Stockton Thunder

West Division
Alaska Aces
Idaho Steelheads
Phoenix RoadRunners
Utah Grizzlies
Victoria Salmon Kings

Regular season

Teams suspend operations in mid-season 
On December 2, the Augusta Lynx suspended operations and voluntarily relinquished their membership to the league, in effect becoming the first team in the league's 21-year history to suspend midseason.  Lynx owners stated that financial troubles and failed attempts to find additional investors were causes for the team to suspend operations.  Dan Troutman, one of the team's owners, stated that he had asked the league to take over operations so the team could finish the season, but the move was voted down by the league's Board of Governors.  The owners had also stated that attendance issues, in which Augusta has ranked no higher than 20th in the league the past three seasons, as the major reason for their financial problems as the team was successful in sponsorship issues.

On December 22, the Fresno Falcons became the second team in twenty days to cease operations, as the league's Board of Governors voted unanimously to terminate the franchise after Fresno's ownership notified the league that they were unable to continue the membership for financial reasons.  Fresno Hockey Club, LLC., the team's ownership group, cited "overwhelming financial issues due to declining attendance and dwindling corporate sponsorships" as reasons the team did not continue to operate for the 2008–09 season.  This move came less than a year after the team signed a 20-year lease with Selland Arena (starting with the 2008–09 season) and an agreement with the city of Fresno in which the city invested $5 million into upgrades for hockey at Selland Arena, as long as the team would not be sold or moved without the direct approval from the city.  A clause in the agreement, stated that the city could take over the team as a government agency if owners were unable to continue operations; however, the option was declined after it was determined that the hockey club would finish the season $500,000 under expenses.  City officials had expressed interest in bringing the franchise back as early as the 2009–10 season, although ECHL Commissioner was less enthusiastic stating that "a great deal of damage had been done" and that the league would give a new ownership "nine to ten months of lead time to create a solid foundation." At the time of their folding, the Falcons were in first place of the Pacific Division and had the fifth best record in the ECHL.

League standings
Note: GP = Games played; W = Wins; L= Losses; OTL = Overtime losses; SOL = Shootout losses; GF = Goals for; GA = Goals against; PTS = Points; PCT = Winning percentage; Green shade = Clinched playoff spot; Blue shade = Clinched division; Red shade = team is eliminated from playoffs; (z) = Clinched home-ice advantage

* Augusta folded on December 3, 2008.  Fresno folded on December 22, 2008.
 
American Conference

† Percentage of points earned is used to determine playoff seedings in the Southern Division due to unbalanced schedules, as Gwinnett played one more game than the other teams.

National Conference

† Percentage of points earned is used to determine playoff seedings in the Pacific Division due to unbalanced schedules, as Ontario and Las Vegas played one more game than Bakersfield and Stockton after the schedule was adjusted.

All Star Classic
The ECHL All-Star Game was played in Reading, Pennsylvania, on January 21, 2009, hosted by the Reading Royals.  The American Conference defeated the National Conference 11–5, with Matthew Ford of Charlotte and Florida's Kevin Baker both scoring hat tricks to overcome a 3–1 deficit after the first period.

* Fresno's termination was announced on December 22, 2008, after ECHL All-Star voting had ended.  As such, these players were voted as representatives of Fresno.  Fallon's case is unique because he had moved to the American Conference.  MacAulay joined head coach Matt Thomas at Stockton, in the National Conference

Playoff format 
On June 23, the league announced its new playoff format for the 2008–09 season.  The playoffs would feature a total of sixteen teams (eight from each conference) and four rounds of play.

As it was originally announced, the top four finishers in each division were seeded based on regular season point totals. The Division Semifinals had the first seed meeting the fourth seed and the second seed meeting the third seed in a best-of-seven series. The winners of the Division Semifinals advanced to the Division Finals, a best-of-seven series. The Division Finals winners advanced to a best-of-seven Conference Finals series. The winner of the American Conference and the winner of the National Conference met in the Kelly Cup Finals, a best-of-seven game series. Home-ice advantage was determined by regular season points.  This format is similar to that used by the American Hockey League for the 2009 Calder Cup playoffs.

At the Mid-Season Board of Governors Meeting in Reading, Pennsylvania, during All-Star Game, two changes were announced for the playoff format due to Augusta and Fresno folding mid-season. In the National Conference, instead of the top four teams in each division making the playoffs, the top eight teams (of the nine in the conference) made the playoffs; the fourth seed in the Pacific Division playoffs was determined by the team with the better record between fourth place in the Pacific Division and fifth place in the Western Division.  All seeding in the National Conference and in the American Conference's Southern Division used percentage of points won because of an unbalanced number of games played caused by rescheduling (Points divided by Games Played, then divided by two).

Kelly Cup playoffs

Bracket

ECHL awards

All-ECHL Teams
Bryan Ewing and Jean Philippe Lamoureux were named to both All-ECHL and ECHL All-Rookie Teams.

First Team
Kevin Baker (F) – Florida Everblades
Bryan Ewing (F) – Wheeling Nailers
Travis Morin (F) – South Carolina Stingrays
Ryan Gunderson (D) – Trenton Devils
Dylan Yeo (D) – Victoria Salmon Kings
Jean-Philippe Lamoureux (G) – Alaska Aces

Second Team
Dave Bonk (F) – Bakersfield Condors
Mark Derlago (F) – Bakersfield Condors
Wes Goldie (F) – Victoria Salmon Kings
Peter Metcalf (D) – Alaska Aces
Matt Shasby (D) – Alaska Aces
Gerald Coleman (G) – Trenton Devils

All-Rookie Team
The Wheeling Nailers set a league record with four rookies being named to the ECHL All-Rookie Team, surpassing the previous record of two which had occurred on six separate occasions.
Bryan Ewing (F) – Wheeling Nailers
Jordan Morrison (F) – Wheeling Nailers
Matt Pope (F) – Bakersfield Condors
Mitch Ganzak (D) – Wheeling Nailers
Elgin Reid (D) – Wheeling Nailers
Jean-Philippe Lamoureux (G) – Alaska Aces

References

External links
ECHL Official site

 
ECHL seasons
3
3